Ji Cheong-cheon (25 January 1888 – 15 January 1957), also known as Yi Cheong-cheon, was a Korean independence activist during the period of Japanese rule (1910–1945).  He later became a South Korean politician.  His name was originally Ji Seok-gyu , but he took the nom de guerre Ji Cheong-cheon, meaning "Earth and Blue Sky", while leading Korean guerrilla forces against the Japanese. He also went by Ji Dae-hyoung, Ji Su-bong, Ji Eul-gyu, Lee Cheong-Cheon, and Lee Dae-hyoung to hide his identity from Japanese forces while conducting military independence activities. Used the pen name Baeksan, meaning White (Bright, Clear, Snowy) Mountain.

He was a 1914 graduate of the Imperial Japanese Army Academy; however, he defected to the Korean guerrilla forces in 1919, bringing with him knowledge of modern military techniques when he was a lieutenant in the Imperial Japanese Army.  His skills were appreciated by the Korean guerrilla forces who made him the superintendent of the Sinheung Military Academy where new leaders of the Korean forces were being trained.

In 1940, he became the commander-in-chief of the Korean Liberation Army sponsored by the Chinese Nationalists.  During the Second World War, he invited General Hong Sa-ik, the highest ranking Korean officer in the Imperial Japanese Army, to defect and join the Korean Liberation Army, but the invitation was declined.

Following Korea's liberation, he served as a member of the South Korea's National Assembly. He died in 1959, and was posthumously honored by the government of South Korea with the Order of Independence Merit for National Foundation in 1962.

See also 

 Korean independence movement
 Shin Pal-gyun

Links
 Profile, ww2db.com; accessed 6 June 2017.

1888 births
1957 deaths
Korean generals
Korean independence activists
Military history of Korea
Members of the National Assembly (South Korea)
Japanese military personnel
Recipients of the Order of Merit for National Foundation
Chungju Ji clan
Imperial Korean Army Cadets